Bendix Hallenstein (c. 24 January 1835 – 6 January 1905) was a German-born Jewish merchant, statesman, and manufacturer from Dunedin, New Zealand. He is best known for founding the retail clothing store Hallensteins, which still bears his name, and is now part of the Hallensteins Glassons group. He also founded the D.I.C. (department store) in Dunedin in 1884.

Biography

Hallenstein was born in Bisperode, Duchy of Brunswick, part of the German Confederation, on about 24 January 1835 to Reuben Hallenstein and Helena Michaelis; he was their third and youngest son. His parents owned a wool mill in Lügde. In 1852, at the age of 17, he moved to Manchester, England, where his maternal uncle operated a shipping office.

In 1857 he followed his brothers, Isaac and Michaelis, to Daylesford in the Victorian goldfields, Australia. Each of the three brothers wished to marry their housekeeper, Mary Mountain (1826-1907), but it was ultimately Bendix she chose to marry. They were wed in the Anglican parish church in Alford, Lincolnshire, on 14 February 1861. They had four daughters; Sara (married Willi Fels), Emily (married Isidore de Beer), Henrietta (married James Francis (Frank) Hyams; died 1895 soon after childbirth), and Agnes (married Siegfried Barden).

In 1873 he founded the New Zealand Clothing Factory in Dunedin to provide men's clothing for his stores. He opened a store in The Octagon selling clothing at wholesale price; the retail clothing chain Hallensteins still bears his name. He also founded the Drapery and General Importing Company of New Zealand Ltd, later known as the D.I.C., in 1884.

Hallenstein was the mayor of Queenstown Borough from 1869 to 1872. He was appointed German consul for Dunedin in 1892.

Hallenstein's son-in-law (and nephew) Willi Fels was a prominent philanthropist and arts collector in early Dunedin. Hallenstein's great-grandson Charles Brasch was a noted poet, literary editor and arts patron.

In 2010, Hallenstein was posthumously inducted into the New Zealand Business Hall of Fame.

References

External links
Gordon Parry: Hallenstein, Bendix. In: Dictionary of New Zealand Biography. New Zealand Ministry for Culture and Heritage

German emigrants to New Zealand
Jewish mayors
Jewish New Zealand politicians
Businesspeople from Dunedin
Politicians from Dunedin
People from the Duchy of Brunswick
Members of the New Zealand House of Representatives
New Zealand MPs for South Island electorates
Mayors of Queenstown-Lakes
New Zealand people of German-Jewish descent
1835 births
1905 deaths
Burials at Dunedin Southern Cemetery
19th-century New Zealand politicians
Hallenstein family
People associated with Otago Museum